Chaetobranchus is a small genus of cichlid fishes from South America where they are native to the Amazon Basin, Orinoco Basin and rivers in the Guianas.

Species
There are currently two recognized species in this genus:
 Chaetobranchus flavescens Heckel, 1840
 Chaetobranchus semifasciatus Steindachner, 1875

References

Chaetobranchini
Cichlid genera
Taxa named by Johann Jakob Heckel